Alan Ebringer  B.Sc, MD, FRCP, FRACP, FRCPath (born 12 February 1936) is an Australian immunologist, professor at King’s College in the University of London. He is also an Honorary Consultant Rheumatologist in the Middlesex Hospital, now part of the UCH School of Medicine. He is known for his research in the field of autoimmune disease.

Early life and education
Ebringer was educated in Melbourne High School, and  graduated in Medicine from the University of Melbourne. He has three children and eight grandchildren.

Career
Ebringer worked for one year as a Medical Registrar at the Walter Eliza Hall Institute under Sir Macfarlane Burnet and Prof. Ian Mackay where he developed an interest in autoimmune diseases.

He moved to London in the 1970s, working first with Ivan Roitt in the Department of Immunology at the Middlesex Hospital. In 1972, he formed the Immunology Unit at Queen Elizabeth College, now linked to King’s College which was located in the Departments of Biochemistry, Microbiology and Biology studying   autoimmune diseases. About 22 Ph.D. students graduated from the Immunology Unit over the subsequent thirty years.

Ebringer was among the first to investigate the relationship between autoimmune diseases such as rheumatoid arthritis and certain bacteria, Proteus mirabilis in particular (Ankylosing Spondylitis and Klebsiella pneumoniae; Multiple Sclerosis and Acinetobacter calcoaceticus).  His findings have been cited by proponents of herbal medicine Low-starch and gluten-free diets.

Publications
Ebringer is the author of several books on the subject of autoimmune disease, including  Rheumatoid arthritis and Proteus. and Ankylosing spondylitis and Klebsiella (Springer publications)  He also published a number of articles on the subject in peer reviewed journals.

References 

Australian immunologists
1936 births
Living people
Academics of King's College London